MetWest High School is a public high school in Oakland, California, United States. It is especially focused on learning through internships. The Oakland Unified School District (OUSD) states that the school "has among the highest attendance rates, the highest California High School Exit Exam pass rates, and lowest suspension rates of all OUSD high schools".

History
The school opened in 2002.

Description
The school has 157 students from all parts of Oakland. The school serves grades 9 through 12.

Notes

External links
 Profile at Oakland Unified School District

High schools in Oakland, California
2002 establishments in California
Oakland Unified School District
Educational institutions established in 2002